Tiago André Carvalho Nogueira (born 20 October 1983), known as Tiago André, is a Portuguese football player who plays for AD Fafe.

Club career
He made his professional debut in the Segunda Liga for Gil Vicente on 18 August 2007 in a game against Estoril.

References

External links

1983 births
People from Fafe
Living people
Portuguese footballers
AD Fafe players
FC Porto B players
Gil Vicente F.C. players
Liga Portugal 2 players
S.C. Espinho players
GD Bragança players
F.C. Tirsense players
G.D. Ribeirão players
S.C. Freamunde players
Amarante F.C. players
Juventude de Pedras Salgadas players
Association football forwards
Sportspeople from Braga District